Daniel P. Coughlin is an American film and fiction writer.

Early life 
After a stint in the United States Marine Corps infantry, where he served as a machine-gunner stationed at Camp Pendleton, California and served in Operation Desert Fox, he earned a degree in Film and Television from California State University, Long Beach.

Writing career 
Coughlin has written three feature films: Lake Dead, [[Farm House (film)|Farm House]], and Ditch Day Massacre. He has two published novels Ted's Score and The Last Custome. His latest work, Craven's Red'', was released September 11, 2013.

References

External links

American male screenwriters
People from Watertown, Wisconsin
Living people
Screenwriters from Wisconsin
Year of birth missing (living people)